The gmina (Polish: , plural gminy ) is the principal unit of the administrative division of Poland, similar to a municipality. , there were 2,477 gminas throughout the country, encompassing over 43,000 villages. 940 gminas include cities and towns, with 302 among them constituting an independent urban gmina consisting solely of a standalone town or one of the 107 cities, the latter governed by a city mayor (prezydent miasta).

The gmina has been the basic unit of territorial division in Poland since 1974, when it replaced the smaller gromada (cluster). Three or more gminas make up a higher level unit called powiat, except for those holding the status of a city with powiat rights. Each and every powiat has the seat in a city or town, in the latter case either an urban gmina or a part of an urban-rural one.

Types
There are three types of gmina:
302 urban gmina constituted either by a standalone town or one of the 107 cities, the latter governed by a city mayor (prezydent miasta), including 66 cities with powiat rights
638 mixed urban-rural gmina consisting of a town and surrounding villages and countryside; other than Gmina Nowe Skalmierzyce, seat of an urban-rural gmina is almost always located in the town
1537 rural gmina consisting only of villages and countryside (occasionally of just one village).

Some rural gminy have their seat in a town which itself is outside of the gmina's territory. For example, the rural Gmina Augustów is administered from the town of Augustów, but does not include the town, as Augustów is an urban type gmina in its own right.

107 urban gminas constitute cities, distinguished from towns through being governed by a city mayor (prezydent miasta) instead of a town mayor (burmistrz), the status awarded automatically to all urban gminas over 100,000 inhabitants or those with a status of a city with powiat rights, with some others allowed to retain the earlier awarded title due to historical reasons. 66 among the 107 cities (including all voivodeship seats and all cities over 100,000 inhabitants) have the special status of city with powiat rights (miasto na prawach powiatu). Such a city exercises also powers and duties of a powiat while not belonging to any; nevertheless, it may still be a seat of a regular powiat, albeit without belonging to it administratively (such powiat thus being often ″doughnut-shaped″). In such cities, the roles of the powiat organs are fulfilled by the ones of the urban gmina.

For a complete listing of all the gminy in Poland, see List of Polish gminas.

Government
Polish gminas operate under a mayor-council government. 

The legislative and oversight body of each gmina is the elected municipal council (rada gminy), in an urban-rural gmina called the town and gmina council (rada miasta i gminy), while in an urban gmina it is called the town/city council (rada miasta). 

Any local laws considered non-compliant with the national ones may be invalidated by the respective voivode, whose rulings may be appealed to an administrative court. Decisions in individual cases may in turn be appealed to quasi-judicial bodies named , their ruling subject to appeal to an administrative court. 

Executive power is held in the municipality by a directly elected official, called wójt in rural gminy, a town mayor (burmistrz) in urban-rural and most urban gminas which contain towns, or a city mayor (prezydent miasta) in the 107 urban gminas containing cities, the status awarded automatically to all urban gminas over 100,000 inhabitants or those with a status of a city with powiat rights, with some others allowed to retain the earlier awarded title due to historical reasons. A town or city mayor may be scrutinized  or denied funding for his/her projects by the council, but is not politically responsible to it and does not require its confidence to remain in office; therefore, cohabitation is not uncommon. 

In a city with powiat rights, the city mayor additionally has the powers and duties of a powiat executive board and a starosta, while the city council has the powers and duties of a powiat (county) council; both nevertheless being elected under the municipal election rules rather than those applicable to county elections.

A recall referendum may be triggered either in respect to the wójt/town mayor/city mayor or to the municipal council through a petition supported by at least 1/10 of eligible voters, but the turnout in the recall referendum must be at least 3/5 of the number of people voting in the original election in order for the referendum to be valid and binding. In addition, elected bodies of any municipality may be suspended by the Prime Minister of Poland in case of persisting law transgressions or negligence, resulting in such case in the municipality being placed under receivership.

A gmina may create auxiliary units (jednostki pomocnicze), which play a subordinate administrative role. In rural areas these are called sołectwa, in towns they may be dzielnice or osiedla and in an urban-rural gmina, the town itself may be designated as an auxiliary unit. The only gmina which is statutorily obliged to have auxiliary units is Warsaw, which is divided since 2002 into 18 boroughs exercising some devolved powers, though not considered separate entities.

Administrative tasks and objectives
Each gmina carries out two classes of tasks:
 own tasks – public tasks exercised by gmina as its inherent exclusive competence and financed by its own means, which serve to satisfy the needs of the community. 
 commissioned tasks – tasks of the central government, delegated entirely or partially to gminas, along with an appropriate mandatory government subvention to support them

The tasks can be also divided into another two categories:
 compulsory – where the municipality cannot abstain from carrying out the tasks, and must set up a budget to carry them out in order to provide the inhabitants with the basic public benefits
 optional – where the municipality can carry them out in accordance with available budgetary means, set out only to specific local needs (on the gmina's own responsibility and budget).

Own tasks 
Own tasks include matters such as spatial harmony, real estate management, environmental protection and nature conservation, water management, country roads, public streets, bridges, squares and traffic systems, water supply systems and source, the sewage system, removal of urban waste, water treatment, maintenance of cleanliness and order, sanitary facilities, dumps and council waste, supply of electric and thermal energy and gas, public transport, health care, welfare, care homes, subsidised housing, public education, cultural facilities including public libraries and other cultural institutions, historic monuments conservation and protection, the sports facilities and tourism including recreational grounds and devices, marketplaces and covered markets, green spaces and public parks, communal graveyards, public order and safety, fire and flood protection with equipment maintenance and storage, maintaining objects and devices of the public utility and administrative buildings, pro-family policy including social support for pregnant women, medical and legal care, supporting and popularising the self-government initiatives and cooperation within the commune including with non-governmental organizations, interaction with regional communities from other countries, etc.

Commissioned tasks 
Commissioned tasks cover the remaining public tasks resulting from legitimate needs of the state, commissioned by central government for the units of local government to implement. The tasks are handed over on the basis of statutory by-laws, charters and regulations, or by way of agreements between the self-government units and central-government administration.

Overall number of gminy by type

Abbreviations used for voivodeships:
LS: Lower Silesian Voivodeship, KP: Kuyavian-Pomeranian Voivodeship, LBL: Lublin Voivodeship, LBS: Lubusz Voivodeship, ŁD: Łódź Voivodeship, LP: Lesser Poland Voivodeship, MS: Masovian Voivodeship, OP: Opole Voivodeship, SK: Subcarpathian Voivodeship, PD: Podlaskie Voivodeship, PM: Pomeranian Voivodeship, SL: Silesian Voivodeship, ŚWK: Świętokrzyskie Voivodeship, WM: Warmian-Masurian Voivodeship, GP: Greater Poland Voivodeship, WP: West Pomeranian Voivodeship.

Largest and smallest gminy

References

Official report from the Central Statistical Office of Poland dated January 1, 2006, (pages 49–151, in Polish)

External links

 
Subdivisions of Poland
Local government in Poland
Poland